Blacksville is an unincorporated community in Henry County, Georgia, United States. At the 2000 census it was recorded as a census-designated place (CDP), with a population of four. It was no longer a CDP at the 2010 census.

Blacksville is named after the Black family of McDonough, Georgia, their family were one of the early pioneers to move to the village of McDonough where Blacksville is now located today. The segregation-era black high school for Henry County was in Blacksville and is now used as Henry County Middle School. Most of the community was subsequently annexed by nearby McDonough.

Geography

Major highways
 Interstate 75
 U.S. Highway 23
 Georgia State Route 20
 Georgia State Route 42
 Georgia State Route 81
 Georgia State Route 155
 Georgia State Route 401

Demographics

While many people continue to live in the area formerly known as Blacksville, as of the census of 2000, there were 4 people, 1 household, and 1 family residing in the CDP, down from 1,112 in 1990. There was one housing unit at an average density of 12.7/sq mi (4.8/km2). The racial makeup of the CDP was 75.00% White and 25.00% from two or more races. None of the population were Hispanic or Latino of any race.

The single household consisted of a married couple living together with children under the age of 18.  The average household size was 4.00 and the average family size was 4.00.

In the CDP the population was spread out, with 25.0% under the age of 18, 50.0% from 25 to 44 and 25.0% from 45 to 64. The median age was 28 years. For every 100 females, there were 100.0 males. For every 100 females age 18 and over, there were 50.0 males.

The median income for a household in the CDP was $53,750, and the median income for a family was $53,750. Males had a median income of $26,250 versus $21,250 for females. The per capita income for the CDP was $13,527.

References

Unincorporated communities in Henry County, Georgia
Unincorporated communities in Georgia (U.S. state)